Si is a tambon (subdistrict) of Khun Han District, in Si Sa Ket Province, Thailand. In 2017 it had a total population of 11,476 people.

Administration

Central administration
The tambon is subdivided into 14 administrative villages (muban).

Local administration
The area of the subdistrict is shared by 2 local governments.
the subdistrict municipality (Thesaban Tambon) Khun Han (เทศบาลตำบลขุนหาญ)
the subdistrict municipality (Thesaban Tambon) Si (เทศบาลตำบลสิ)

See also
List of short place names

References

External links
Thaitambon.com on Si

Tambon of Sisaket Province